Jean-Pierre Kérien (15 March 1912 – 9 April 1984) was a French film actor. He appeared in 40 films between 1937 and 1979.

Filmography

References

External links

1912 births
1984 deaths
French male film actors
20th-century French male actors